Logha is an island of the Solomon Islands, that  is located within the Western Province. The estimated terrain elevation above sea level is some 28 metres.

See also

References

Islands of the Solomon Islands
Western Province (Solomon Islands)